Belikin is the leading domestically produced beer brand in Belize.

Belikin is brewed by the Belize Brewing Company, Ltd. which is owned by the Bowen family. The Belize Brewing Company was established in 1969, and began brewing Belikin Beer and Belikin Stout brand name in 1971. Its tagline is "The Beer of Belize".

The name "Belikin" comes from the Maya language and means "Route to the East". This is a term which some have suggested is the origin of the name of "Belize" (although the most accepted derivation says the name comes from the Belize River, meaning "muddy"). The Belikin label features a drawing of a Pre-Columbian Maya temple-pyramid at Altun Ha.

The most common Belikin is a light lager beer. Lighthouse Lager, Belikin Premium and a stout beer are also brewed and sold under the Belikin name.

The brewery is based in Ladyville, Belize District.

Products marketed by Belikin 
Belikin produces the following beers:
Belikin Beer
Belikin Stout
Belikin Premium
Guinness (local brewer and distributor)
Lighthouse Lager

Community Impact 
The parent company of Belikin, Bowen & Bowen, support community environmental preservation efforts through coastal cleanups and recycling projects.

References

External links 
 Belikin Official Website
 Belikin on RealBeer.com
 Belikin on the San Pedro Sun site

Belizean cuisine
Beer in Central America
Beer brands
Beer in the Caribbean
Economy of Belize
Belizean brands